Frank Gaines may refer to:

 Frank D. Gaines (1934–2011), Kansas state legislator
 Frank S. Gaines (1890–1977), mayor of Berkeley, California, 1939–1943
 Frank Gaines (basketball) (born 1990), American basketball player